Teius oculatus is a species of lizard found in Brazil, Paraguay, Uruguay and Argentina.

References 

Teius
Reptiles described in 1837
Taxa named by Alcide d'Orbigny
Taxa named by Gabriel Bibron